Nanny is a 2022 American psychological horror film written and directed by Nikyatu Jusu, in her feature directorial debut. The film stars Anna Diop, Michelle Monaghan, Sinqua Walls, Morgan Spector, Rose Decker, and Leslie Uggams. Jason Blum serves as an executive producer through his Blumhouse Television banner.

Nanny had its world premiere at the Sundance Film Festival on January 22, 2022, where it won the Grand Jury Prize, making it the first horror film to ever win this award at Sundance. The film was given a limited theatrical release on November 23, 2022, by Amazon Studios, prior to streaming on Prime Video on December 16, 2022.

Plot
Aisha is an illegal Senegalese immigrant in New York City. She left her now six-year-old son, Lamine, in the care of her cousin, Mariatou, in Senegal a year earlier. She hopes to earn enough money to bring her son and cousin as immigrants to the United States to live with her.

Aisha is hired as a nanny for Rose, the young daughter of Amy and Adam Hav, a wealthy Upper East Side couple. She and Rose become very close, while Amy and Adam are distracted by their careers, often causing Aisha to have to stay lateor even overnightwhen neither parent returns home.

Aisha attracts the attention of Malik, the doorman at the Havs' apartment building. They soon begin a relationship, to the approval of Kathleen, Malik's grandmother, and Bishop, his son, who is roughly Lamine's age. Kathleen and Aisha share an undercurrent of magical perception.

The Havs are often remiss in paying Aisha, which delays her being able to cover airfare for Lamine and Mariatou. She begins having dreams of drowning, as well as waking visions of Lamine.

Amy leaves the family with no notice, leaving Aisha to stay full time while Adam tries to sort things out. Alone with Rose one evening, Aisha begins having visions and Rose seemingly disappears from the apartment. When she hears voices, she grabs a knife from the kitchen and checks the bathroom, where she is mysteriously pulled into the full tub and almost drowns. She suddenly realizes Rose is in the tub, bathing. She begs Rose's forgiveness for scaring her with the knife, to which Rose replies that it is Lamine causing the visions, as he is jealous of Aisha's attention to Rose.

Aisha finally raises the funds for airfare. Mariatou arrives alone, saying that during the long wait for the airfare, Lamine drowned in the ocean during a beach visit. Malik takes Aisha, now pregnant with their child, to stay with him, Bishop and Kathleen. Aisha goes for a walk, a ruse to go and drown herself in the Hudson River. Malik rescues her, and they move on with life, including their new baby.

Cast

 Anna Diop as Aisha
 Michelle Monaghan as Amy
 Sinqua Walls as Malik
 Morgan Spector as Adam
 Rose Decker as Rose
 Leslie Uggams as Kathleen
 Zephani Idoko as Sallay

In addition, Olamide Candide-Johnson and Jahleel Kamara make brief appearances as Mariatou and Lamine, respectively.

Production
On April 13, 2021, it was announced that Nikyatu Jusu would make her directorial debut with Nanny, a film that she wrote and is part of the 2020 The Black List of screenplays that would not be released in theaters during that calendar year. In June 2021, Anna Diop, Michelle Monaghan, Sinqua Walls, Morgan Spector, Zephani Idoko and Phylicia Rashad joined the cast of the film. Phylicia Rashad was replaced by Leslie Uggams before production began.

Principal photography began in June 2021 in New York City, with cinematography by Rina Yang.

Release
Nanny had its world premiere at the Sundance Film Festival on January 22, 2022. In March 2022, Amazon Studios and Blumhouse Productions acquired distribution rights to the film in a deal around $7 million, winning them in a competitive situation that also included Sony Pictures Classics and Neon. Jason Blum, who joined the film as an executive producer post-acquisition, remarked: "We're proud to have writer/director Nikyatu Jusu's Nanny as part of our slate for Amazon. It's a gem of a horror film that combines impressive filmmaking and powerful storytelling, and is worthy of the Grand Jury Prize it was awarded at Sundance." The studios plan to release the film both theatrically and on Prime Video. A special presentation of the film was screened at the Toronto International Film Festival in September 2022, followed by one at the 2022 AFI Fest on November 3, 2022. Nanny was given a limited theatrical release on November 23, 2022, by Amazon Studios, prior to streaming on Prime Video starting December 16, 2022.

Reception
The film received positive reviews from critics.

Accolades
At the 2022 Sundance Film Festival, Nanny won the Grand Jury Prize in the US Dramatic Competition, which made the film the first horror film, and Jusu the second Black female filmmaker, to ever win the top prize.

References

External links
 
 Official screenplay

2022 horror films
2022 independent films
2020s American films
2020s English-language films
Amazon Studios films
American psychological horror films
Blumhouse Productions films
Films about illegal immigration to the United States
Films about nannies
Films impacted by the COVID-19 pandemic
Films set in New York City
Films shot in New York City
Sundance Film Festival award winners
Topic Studios films
African-American films